Atuna elliptica is a species of plant in the family Chrysobalanaceae. It is endemic to Fiji.

References

elliptica
Endemic flora of Fiji
Vulnerable plants
Taxonomy articles created by Polbot
Plants described in 1969
Taxa named by André Joseph Guillaume Henri Kostermans